Cathy Thaxton-Tippett (born March 31, 1957) is an American rower. She competed at the 1984 Summer Olympics and the 1988 Summer Olympics.

After competing for Stanford University during her undergrad years, she earned her master's degree in education from Northern Arizona University and went on to teach in the Salmon School District in Idaho.

References

External links
 

1957 births
Living people
American female rowers
Olympic rowers of the United States
Rowers at the 1984 Summer Olympics
Rowers at the 1988 Summer Olympics
Stanford Cardinal women's rowers
Place of birth missing (living people)
Northern Arizona University alumni